The 2003 Toronto Argonauts finished in 2nd place in the East Division of the  2003 CFL season with a 9–9 record. They won the East Semi-Final but lost the East Final.

Offseason

CFL draft

Preseason

Regular season

Season standings

Regular season

 † Game rescheduled from August 14 due to the Northeast blackout of 2003.

Postseason

Awards and records

2003 CFL All-Stars
WR – Tony Miles
DT – Eric England
CB – Adrion Smith
DB – Clifford Ivory
DS – Orlondo Steinauer
P – Noel Prefontaine
ST – Bashir Levingston

Eastern Division All-Star selections
WR – Tony Miles
DT – Eric England
CB – Adrion Smith
DB – Clifford Ivory
DS – Orlondo Steinauer
P – Noel Prefontaine
ST – Bashir Levingston

References

Toronto Argonauts seasons
Toro